Zeugma was a Dacian town mentioned by Ptolemy.

See also 
 Dacian davae
 List of ancient cities in Thrace and Dacia

Notes

References

Ancient

Modern 

 

Dacian towns